A Lydian cadence is a type of half cadence that was popular in the Ars nova style of the 14th and early 15th century. It is also the most common type of double-leading-tone cadence, as it contains two leading-tone resolutions (- and -). A frequently-used type of Landini cadence is based on the Lydian cadence, with the upper voice dropping to  before skipping back up to the tonic. 

Cadences